Other Voices is the seventh studio album by the Doors, released by Elektra Records in October 1971. It was the first album released by the band following the death of lead singer Jim Morrison in July 1971 with keyboardist Ray Manzarek and guitarist Robby Krieger sharing lead vocals. Tracks for the album had begun before Morrison's death and the band hoped that Morrison would return from Paris to finish them.

Background and recording
Following the critical and commercial success of L.A. Woman and Jim Morrison's death in 1971, the surviving members of the Doors continued as a trio to record their seventh album as "the critics were already calling it". Reflecting on the album in 2021, Robby Krieger noted the band's difficulty to continue working after Morrison's death:

Later releases

According to Jac Holzman, Other Voices sold approximately 300,000 copies on its original release. The album was not released on CD until October 23, 2006, by the Timeless Holland label, along with the final Doors album, Full Circle. For years, the Doors largely disregarded the last two studio albums that were recorded without Morrison, and had no plans of reissuing the albums on CD. At the time, the Doors stated that they were not in possession of the master tapes, but remastered material from both the albums has appeared on various compilations, most notably the 1997 Box Set and the 2000 compilation The Best of the Doors. 

On September 27, 2011, The Doors finally gave Other Voices (along with Full Circle) its first official reissue, though made available only via digital download. The original master tapes were confirmed to have been used in these reissues. 

On May 29, 2015, it was announced that Other Voices and Full Circle would be re-released together on a 2-CD set and individually on 180-gram vinyl by Rhino Records on September 4 of that year. The CD set features "Treetrunk"—the B-side of the "Get Up and Dance" single—as its only bonus track.

Track listing 
The LP's original Elektra Records 1971 release show the individual song credits and lengths as listed below (though each songs' lead vocalists are not credited):

Personnel 
Per album liner notes:

The Doors
Ray Manzarek – vocals, keyboards, production
Robby Krieger – vocals, guitar, production
John Densmore – drums, production

Additional personnel
Jack Conrad – bass guitar on "In the Eye of the Sun", "Variety Is the Spice of Life" and "Tightrope Ride"
Jerry Scheff – bass on "Down On The Farm", "I'm Horny, I'm Stoned" and "Wandering Musician"
Wolfgang Melz – bass on "Hang on to Your Life"
Ray Neapolitan – bass on "Ships w/ Sails"
Willie Ruff – acoustic bass on "Ships w/ Sails"
Francisco Aguabella – percussion on "Ships w/ Sails" and "Hang on to Your Life"
Emil Richards – marimba on "Down on the Farm"

Production
Bruce Botnick – production, engineering
Ron Raffaelli – artwork

References 

The Doors albums
1971 albums
Elektra Records albums
Albums produced by Bruce Botnick
Albums produced by Robby Krieger
Albums produced by John Densmore
Albums produced by Ray Manzarek